DJ Shub (Dan General) is a Mohawk DJ and music producer and member of the Six Nations of the Grand River. He has won numerous awards for his work as a former member of A Tribe Called Red, a DJ, and for solo pursuits.

Career
Shub began practising  skills in his parents' basement, eventually winning the Canadian title at DJ competitions in 2007 and 2008. In 2012, he also represented Canada in the Redbull Thre3Style DJ competition in Chicago. 

DJ Shub has won numerous awards as a DJ including DMC Canada DJ Championship titles (2007 and 2008), a DMC Canadian Battle for Supremacy title (2008), a Canadian Red Bull Thre3style title (2012).

DJ Shub was a member of the group A Tribe Called Red, leaving in 2014. With the group DJ Shub recorded a number of albums, including Nation II Nation, winning a number of awards, including Aboriginal People's Choice Music Award.

On December 2, 2016 DJ Shub released an EP entitled PowWowStep. It includes six songs featuring the Northern Cree Singers, smoke dance singer Frazer Sundown, and a northern drum from Blackfoot territory called Black Lodge Singers. The album was award with an Indigenous Music Award for Best Instrumental Album in May 2017; the Canadian Organization of Campus Activities (COCA) named him DJ of the Year in June 2017.

DJ Shub's music video for "Indomitable" was shot at the Grand River Champion of Champions Pow Wow in Haudenosaunee territory. It features fancy dancer and techno music producer Classic Roots. The song includes the drums and vocals of the Northern Cree Singers. The video won the 2017 Native American Music Award for Best Music Video. It was nominated for the Best EDM/Dance Video at the 2017 Much Music Video Awards. In 2018, the song "Indomitable" would be used as the opening theme for Sacha Baron Cohen's television series Who Is America?.

DJ Shub won the Canadian Screen Award for Best Original Song for "The Trials", a song from the film The Grizzlies which he cowrote with Thomas Lambe and Adam "Hyper-T" Tanuyak, at the 7th Canadian Screen Awards in 2019.

Awards and recognition

 (

References

External links 

 

Canadian DJs
First Nations musicians
Canadian Mohawk people
Canadian record producers
Living people
Date of birth missing (living people)
Place of birth missing (living people)
Year of birth missing (living people)
Best Original Song Genie and Canadian Screen Award winners
Six Nations of the Grand River
Juno Award for Contemporary Indigenous Artist of the Year winners